Rachael Morelle Blake (born May 26, 1971) is an Australian actress.

Early life
Blake was born in Perth, Western Australia. At the age of 18 months, she moved to England with her English parents, only to return to Perth at age 11. Blake was born deaf in one ear, a condition that was rectified by a series of operations undertaken before she was six. To overcome shyness and her hearing problem, her mother enrolled her in elocution lessons, which she continued until age 17. After attending the John Curtin College of the Arts high school in Perth, she applied to Sydney's National Institute of Dramatic Art (NIDA) but was rejected due to her age of 17. She was accepted to NIDA when she was 19.

Acting career

At 13, Blake was cast in a short film. After studying at NIDA, she worked on Australian television shows Home and Away as Mandy Thomas (1995–1997), Pacific Drive, and Heartbreak High (1996). Blake's first feature film role was as Amy in the Australian children's movie Paws (1997). In 1997, she took the role of Dr Maxine Summers in the ABC crime drama Wildside.

She has also starred in several films, including 2001's Lantana with Anthony LaPaglia, as well as 2003's Perfect Strangers for which she won the Fantasporto Award for Best Actress. Between 2006–2007, she played Hilary Davenport in the British satirical black comedy Suburban Shootout. She played "Belinda" in a British TV movie, Clapham Junction, in 2007. In 2009, she starred in the UKTV mini-series False Witness. She also played a main role in The Prisoner. In 2010, she portrayed Hazel Hawke in the telemovie Hawke.

Blake played the character of Clara in the erotic drama Sleeping Beauty.

In 2012, Blake portrayed Kris Perry in the theatre production of 8 in Sydney and Melbourne. In 2013, she portrayed Lady Tuckworth in the HBO Asia series Serangoon Road. She played a main role in the 2014 drama film Melody, for which she has received recognition (see below). She appeared in the 2016 film Gods of Egypt.

Awards and honours

Blake won the Silver Logie Award for 'Most Outstanding Actress' at the Logie Awards (1999).
She was nominated four times at the Australian film Institute (since 2011 called the AACTA Australian Academy of Cinema and Television Arts Awards) and won the award for 'Best Performance by an Actress in a Leading Role in a Television Drama' for Wildside in 1998 and 'Best Actress for a Supporting role' for Lantana in 2001.
She received the Montréal World Film Festival Award for Best Actress for her portrayal, in the title role, in the 2014 drama film Melody (2014).
In 2004, she won the Best Actress (Melhor Actriz) - Directors' Week Award at Fantasporto film festival (2004) and the Best Actress Award at Pacific Meridian film festival, Vladivostok for Perfect Strangers (2003).
In 2018, she was part of the ensemble cast that won the 'Outstanding Performance by an Ensemble Series in a Drama Series' by Equity Ensemble Awards 2018 for
Cleverman (2016)

Personal life
In 2003, she married Wildside co-star Tony Martin. They later starred together in Serangoon Road.

Filmography

Film

Television

References

External links

Australian people of English descent
1971 births
Living people
Australian film actresses
Australian television actresses
Actresses from Perth, Western Australia
People educated at John Curtin College of the Arts
National Institute of Dramatic Art alumni
Best Supporting Actress AACTA Award winners
20th-century Australian actresses
21st-century Australian actresses